Campeonato Piauiense Second Division is the second level of the football league of the State of Piauí, Brazil. It is organized by the Federação de Futebol do Piauí.

List of champions

Titles by team

Teams in bold stills active.

By city

References